Carcaliu is a commune in Tulcea County, Northern Dobruja, Romania. It is composed of a single village, Carcaliu. At the 2011 census, 91% of inhabitants were Lipovans and 8.9% Romanians.

References

Communes in Tulcea County
Localities in Northern Dobruja